Atte Johannes Muhonen (20 October 1888, Laukaa - 16 February 1954) was a Finnish farmer and politician. He was a member of the Parliament of Finland from 1922 to 1929 and again from 1936 to 1939, representing the Social Democratic Party of Finland (SDP).

References

1888 births
1954 deaths
People from Laukaa
People from Vaasa Province (Grand Duchy of Finland)
Social Democratic Party of Finland politicians
Members of the Parliament of Finland (1922–24)
Members of the Parliament of Finland (1924–27)
Members of the Parliament of Finland (1927–29)
Members of the Parliament of Finland (1936–39)